Diane Pfister is an American artist and art lecturer whose work was first recognized in London, England, and other territories of the United Kingdom. Her early work includes collage, impressionism and abstract expressionism but is now primarily abstract oils, incorporating techniques drawn from microphotography, map coordinates and satellite surveillance to merge abstraction with 21st-century realism.

Background 
Born in Cincinnati, Ohio, Pfister graduated from Norwood High School in Norwood, Ohio in 1973,. With the help of a Charlotte Schmidlapp Honor Scholarship, she studied Fine Arts at Miami University in Oxford, Ohio, earning a Bachelor of Fine Arts in 1977 and doing graduate work from 1979-1980, before proceeding on to post-graduate photographic work at the Parsons School of Design in New York. After moving to London, she studied printmaking during a fellowship at the Slade School of Fine Art and fine art post-graduate work at Saint Martins School of Art, earning a Post Graduate Diploma in Art at the latter.

She lectured at The American School In Switzerland from 1985–1990, Bath School of Art and Design from 1990–1995, and at City of Westminster College, London from 1992–1996; and served as Co-Head of the Third Year Degree Programme at Chelsea College of Art from 1993–1994.

Pfister (who initially painted under her married name of Diane Epstein) worked commercially in various media—including collage, photography and sculpture—for book jacket and poster illustration before committing herself to painting in 1995.

Series
Working principally in oils, her series include "Toys" (in which she explored the "residual power" of the "sacred geometry" of playthings important to her in childhood); "Scars" (a series of nude body studies etched with obscure, lost French dialect calligraphy); "Abstract Locations" (an examination of "how technology has altered traditional notions of viewing our environment"... "a world unknown to us a century ago"); and "End Papers" ("dedicated to the transient beauty of the printed book... fast becoming the dinosaur of our generation"). The latter were the subject of a successful 2006 exhibition at the Duncan Campbell Gallery in London. Pfister's paintings have also been acquired by private and corporate collections in the United States, Asia, Europe, the Middle East and Australia.

Return to the U.S. 
Pfister returned with her family to the United States in 2006, and now lives in Cincinnati, where she maintains a studio at the Pendleton Art Center.

Since relocating with her family to her native country in 2006, Pfister has mounted the exhibition "Painting is Soundless Poetry" at the Good News Gallery in Woodbury, Connecticut. Here she unveiled two more series, "Source Energy" and a series of "Kimono" triptychs, which interested Pfister for the "independent picture plane a kimono creates on the human body." In notes provided to the exhibit, she continued "The East found it more important to ignore the surface of the body, while the West obsessed with the figure. It is the difference between the diaphanous, transcendental and intellectual, versus the worldly and secular. It is my hope that viewing these works may trigger in others the sense of floating in that space."

Critical recognition 
Writing about Pfister's work, David Buckman (author of the standard reference Artists in Britain Since 1945) noted that some artists pursue "a narrow course, hardly deviating from it over a lifetime's work. Pfister has chosen the far tougher route: constantly rethiniking how she can view the world around her. Her career experience and wide training in America and Britain have encouraged an unusual open-mindedness. Paintings as richly diverse as the Abstract Locations, plus all the rest of Pfister's exhibition, need no more explanatory words to justify their merits as compelling images."

Screenwriting 
In 2009, Pfister coauthored The Weight of Salt and Soul with Tim Lucas, an original screenplay based on the life of Ishi, a Native American who was the last of his tribe and acclimated to the white man's world during the early twentieth century.

Exhibitions
Thornbury Castle, Thornbury, Glos (1996); Collyer Bristow Gallery, London (1997); Chelsea & Westiminster Hospital, London (2003); Ashursts Gallery, London (2004); Westbourne Studios, London (2005); Duncan Campbell Gallery, London (2006); The Felix, Cambridge (2007); Good News Gallery, Woodbury, Connecticut (2008).

Notes

1954 births
Living people
Artists from Cincinnati
Alumni of the Slade School of Fine Art